Varis is both a surname and a given name.  In Finnish the word literally means "raven". Notable people with the name include:

Surname
Agnes Varis (1930–2011), American businesswoman
Kaisa Varis (born 1975), Finnish cross-country skier and biathlete
Pekka Varis, Finnish ski-orienteer
Petri Varis (born 1969), Finnish ice hockey player

Given name
Varis Brasla (born 1939), Latvian film director

See also
Vari (disambiguation)
Varys, a fictional character from the A Song of Ice and Fire series and Game of Thrones

Finnish-language surnames
Latvian masculine given names
Surnames from nicknames